Magnus Krog (born 19 March 1987) is a Norwegian nordic combined skier who has competed since 2005.

Career
Krog has three individual and three team World Cup wins in his career. At the 2014 Sochi Winter Olympics, he won the bronze medal in the 10 km normal hill event and the gold in the 4x5 km relay.

References

External links
Magnus Krog – profile at FIS

1987 births
Living people
Olympic Nordic combined skiers of Norway
Nordic combined skiers at the 2014 Winter Olympics
Norwegian male Nordic combined skiers
Olympic gold medalists for Norway
Olympic bronze medalists for Norway
Medalists at the 2014 Winter Olympics
Olympic medalists in Nordic combined
FIS Nordic World Ski Championships medalists in Nordic combined